The Nation Healthcare Security Administration, abbreviated as NHSA is a sub-ministry-level government agency directly under the State Council of the People's Republic of China.

NHSA primarily oversees the state-backed China Healthcare Security including general health insurance plan, maternity insurance, and medical aid programs. In doing that, it oversees the operation of the insurance fund, responsible for centralized purchasing of drugs and medical supplies. It is also responsible for the public-sector healthcare reform. The current director is Hu Jinglin.

References 

Government agencies of China
State Council of the People's Republic of China